Leonard Sarason (1925 – September 24, 1994) was a music composer, a pianist, and a mathematician. He earned a master's degree music composition from Yale University, supervised by Paul Hindemith. After a doctorate in Mathematics at New York University supervised by Kurt Otto Friedrichs he taught mathematics at Stanford University and the University of Washington. His mathematical research concerned partial differential equations.

Media
 Piano Sonata (1948)

References

Yale University alumni
New York University alumni
Stanford University faculty
University of Washington faculty
American male composers
20th-century American mathematicians
1925 births
1994 deaths
20th-century American composers
20th-century American male musicians